Jeřišno is a municipality and village in Havlíčkův Brod District in the Vysočina Region of the Czech Republic. It has about 300 inhabitants.

Administrative parts
Villages of Chuchel, Heřmaň, Podhořice and Vestecká Lhotka are administrative parts of Jeřišno.

References

Villages in Havlíčkův Brod District